Suzy Frelinghuysen (May 7, 1911 – March 19, 1988), also known as Suzy Morris, was an American abstract painter and opera singer.

Early personal life 
Born to a prominent family in Newark, New Jersey, Suzy was a daughter of Frederick Frelinghuysen (1848–1936) and his wife Estelle B. Kinney, who were married in 1902. She descended from various politicians, including her grandfather, Frederick T. Frelinghuysen (Secretary of State under Chester A. Arthur), and her great-great-uncle, Theodore Frelinghuysen (Senator from New Jersey).  She was educated at Miss Fine's school in Princeton, and later studied voice.   She displayed an early interest in painting and drawing but never undertook formal art studies. She attended Miss Fines in Princeton and was separately tutored in art and music all the time making childhood trips to Europe. On January 30, 1935 she married Morris who was encouraging to her artistic career.

Artistic career

Painting 
Her paintings were done in a realist style until the time of her marriage to abstract painter and collector George L.K. Morris in 1935. Morris introduced her to the work of European modernists like Pablo Picasso, Fernand Léger, Georges Braque, and Juan Gris, which inspired her to explore a more abstract Cubist manner.

In April (1937) she joined the American Abstract Artists (AAA) which was an organization concerned with the Museum of Modern Art focusing mainly on American Scene Artists.

In 1938 she became the first woman to have a painting placed in the permanent collection of A.E. Gallatin's Museum of Living Art. She and Morris were founding members of the American Abstract Artists. She took part, in Paris, at the Salon des Réalités Nouvelles, and exhibited also in Rome and Amsterdam.

From 1938 to 1946, Suzy was most successful exhibiting her artwork in Gallitan's Museum of Living Art, exhibition of the Park Avenue Artists which traveled to Chicago, San Francisco, and Honolulu, a show created by Peggy Guggenheim, and Philadelphia Museum of Art in the show Eight by Eight: American Abstract Painting since 1940. By 1947, that can be marked as the end of her painting career as she moved onto her singing career.

In 1943, Frelinghuysen's work was included in Peggy Guggenheim's show Exhibition by 31 Women at the Art of This Century gallery in New York.

Opera 
As Suzy Morris, the dramatic soprano appeared with the New York City Opera from 1947 to 1950, in Ariadne auf Naxos (in the title role, opposite Virginia MacWatters as Zerbinetta), Cavalleria rusticana (as Santuzza, conducted by Julius Rudel), Tosca (as Floria Tosca), Aïda (as Amneris, with Camilla Williams, Ramón Vinay, and Lawrence Winters, directed by Theodore Komisarjevsky), and Les contes d'Hoffmann (as Giulietta).

Following that last appearance with the City Opera, she debuted in 1950 with the New Orleans Opera Association, as Amelia in Un ballo in maschera.  That performance, which was broadcast, also featured Jussi Björling, Marko Rothmüller, Martha Larrimore, the young Norman Treigle (as Samuele), as well as Audrey Schuh (as Oscar, her first major role).  In 1998, VAI released this performance on compact disc.

After a 1951 bout of bronchitis, the soprano retired from the stage, and once more became a full-time painter.

Legacy 

Suzy Frelinghuysen died of a stroke in Pittsfield, Massachusetts at age 76.

Her work can be viewed in the collections of the Metropolitan Museum of Art, the Philadelphia Museum of Art, the Smithsonian American Art Museum, the Carnegie Art Institute, and her home and studio museum in Lenox, Massachusetts.

Exhibitions

1937-1947 American Abstract Artists Annual Exhibitions

1937 Park Avenue Cubist Show at Paul Reinhardt Galleries with Morris, A.E. Gallatin, and Charles G. Shaw

1940 Park Avenue Cubist Show: Tours Chicago, San Francisco, Honolulu

1940 Peggy Guggenheim show: 31 contemporary women artists

1944 Annual Exhibition, Whitney Museum of American Art

1945 Eight by Eight: American Abstract Painting since 1940, Philadelphia Museum of Art

1986 American Abstract Artists 50th Anniversary Exhibition

Collections

Carnegie Art Institute

Metropolitan Museum of Art

Museum of Living Art

Philadelphia Museum of Art

References 
 The New York City Opera: An American Adventure, by Martin L. Sokol, Macmillan Publishing Co, Inc, 1981.

Notes

External links 
 Official web-site:  frelinghuysen.org
  Suzy Morris and Jussi Björling in an excerpt from Un ballo in maschera (1950).
Painting: "Composition--Toreador Drinking," 1944, by Suzy Frelinghuysen, in the Smithsonian American Art Museum

Modern painters
American operatic sopranos
1911 births
1988 deaths
Morris family (Morrisania and New Jersey)
Suzy Frelinghuysen
Cubist artists
20th-century American painters
Painters from New Jersey
American women painters
20th-century American women artists
20th-century American women opera singers